Christopher Brayan Trejo Morantes (born 2 December 1999) is a Mexican professional footballer who plays as a forward for Liga MX club Atlas.

Career statistics

Club

Honours
Atlas
Liga MX: Apertura 2021, Clausura 2022
Campeón de Campeones: 2022

References

External links
Christopher Trejo at Football Database
Christopher Trejo at Soccerway

Atlas F.C. footballers
1999 births
Living people
Association football forwards
Mexican footballers